Biéville may refer to several communes in France:

Biéville, Manche, in the Manche department
Biéville-Beuville, in the Calvados department
Biéville-Quétiéville, in the Calvados department